Lake Granby is the third largest body of water in Colorado.

It was created by the erection of Granby Dam, completed in 1950, as part of the Bureau of Reclamation's Colorado-Big Thompson Project. Water from Lake Granby is pumped via the Farr Pump plant though a pipeline that empties into a canal connected to Shadow Mountain Reservoir. The Bureau of Reclamation owns Farr Pump plant while Northern Water operates it. The lake is popular with anglers and is continually stocked with rainbow trout and kokanee salmon.

 The Lake is also home to the Lake Granby Yacht Club. At , LGYC is one of the highest-elevation yacht clubs in the world, slightly beating out Grand Lake Yacht Club on nearby Grand Lake.

See also
List of largest reservoirs of Colorado

References

Granby
Granby
Arapaho National Forest